The ICC Men's T20 World Cup (earlier known as ICC World Twenty20) was first held in 2007. It was first decided that every two years an ICC T20 World Cup tournament is to take place, except in the event of an ICC Cricket World Cup being scheduled in the same year, in which case it will be held the year before. The first tournament was in 2007 in South Africa where India defeated Pakistan in the final. Two Associate teams had played in the first tournament, selected through the 2007 ICC World Cricket League Division One, a 50-over competition. In December 2007 it was decided to hold a qualifying tournament with a 20-over format to better prepare the teams. With six participants, two would qualify for the 2009 World Twenty20 and would each receive $250,000 in prize money. The second tournament was won by Pakistan who beat Sri Lanka by 8 wickets in England on 21 June 2009. The 2010 ICC World Twenty20 tournament was held in West Indies in May 2010, where England defeated Australia by 7 wickets. The 2012 ICC World Twenty20 was won by the West-Indies, by defeating Sri Lanka at the finals. For the first time, a host nation competed in the final of the ICC World Twenty20. There were 12 participants for the title including Ireland and Afghanistan as 2012 ICC World Twenty20 Qualifier. It was the first time the World Twenty20 tournament took place in an Asian country. Pakistan was the only team to reach the last four in the first four editions of the tournament. 2014 saw the expansion to 16 teams featuring three teams making their debuts. Sri Lanka yet again made it to the Finals this time winning after their two other appearances in previous finals. The ICC Men's T20 World Cup has had five champions from six tournaments.

Background
When the Benson & Hedges Cup ended in 2002, the ECB needed another one day competition to fill its place. Cricketing authorities were looking to boost the game's popularity with the younger generation in response to dwindling crowds and reduced sponsorship. It was intended to deliver fast-paced, exciting cricket accessible to thousands of fans who were put off by the longer versions of the game. Stuart Robertson, the marketing manager of the ECB, proposed a 20 over per innings game to county chairmen in 2001 and they voted 11–7 in favour of adopting the new format.

Regional tournaments
The first official Twenty20 matches were played on 13 June 2003 between the English counties in the Twenty20 Cup. The first season of Twenty20 in England was a relative success. The first Twenty20 match held at Lord's, on 15 July 2004 between Middlesex and Surrey, attracted a crowd of 27,509, the largest attendance for any county cricket game at the ground other than a one-day final since 1953.

Soon after with the adoption of Twenty20 matches by other cricket boards, the popularity of the format grew with unexpected crowd attendance, new regional tournaments such as Pakistan's Faysal Bank T20 Cup and Stanford 20/20 tournament and the financial incentive in the format. West Indies regional teams competed in what was named the Stanford 20/20 tournament. The event was financially backed by billionaire Allen Stanford, who gave at least US$28,000,000 funding money. It was intended that the tournament would be an annual event. A spin-off tournament, the Stanford Super Series was held in October 2008 between Middlesex and Trinidad and Tobago, the respective winners of the English and Caribbean Twenty20 competitions, and a Stanford Superstars team formed from West Indies domestic players. On 1 November, the Stanford Superstars played England in what was expected to be the first of five fixtures in as many years with the winner claiming a US$20,000,000 in each match.

Professional era

Indian Premier League (IPL) is a Twenty20 cricket tournament where 8 city based franchise teams from India participate for the title. The tournament started in 2008 and from then it usually takes place every year in the months of April to June. IPL is the most-watched Twenty20 cricket league in the world and also known for its commercial success.  During the sixth IPL season (2013) its brand value was estimated to be around US$3.03 billion. Live rights to the event are syndicated around the globe, and in 2010, the IPL became the first sporting event to be broadcast live on YouTube.

Twenty20 Internationals

On 17 February 2005 Australia defeated New Zealand in the first men's full international Twenty20 match, played at Eden Park in Auckland. The game was played in a light-hearted manner – both sides turned out in kit similar to that worn in the 1980s, the New Zealand team's a direct copy of that worn by the Beige Brigade. Some of the players also sported moustaches/beards and hair styles popular in the 1980s taking part in a competition amongst themselves for best retro look, at the request of the Beige Brigade. Australia won the game comprehensively, and as the result became obvious towards the end of the NZ innings, the players and umpires took things less seriously – Glenn McGrath jokingly replayed the Trevor Chappell underarm incident from a 1981 ODI between the two sides, and Billy Bowden showed him a mock red card (red cards are not normally used in cricket) in response.

Inaugural tournaments

2007

This was the first World Twenty20, where 12 teams participated, divided into four groups of three, then two groups of four in quarter-finals; top two into semi-finals. Besides the 10 full members, Kenya and Scotland were the other two teams participating in this tournament that was played on three different grounds, Wanderers, Kingsmead and Newlands. The tournament was a huge success. It had everything required for top quality entertainment, including the world's best players and packed out stadiums. The tournament got underway with a stunning display of power hitting from Chris Gayle against South Africa. He clouted 117 off 57 balls, including 10 sixes. Shaun Pollock, Makhaya Ntini- nobody was spared. If this wasn't enough, Yuvraj Singh achieved cricketing nirvana by hitting England's Stuart Broad for six sixes in an over, during a barnstorming and unlikely 12-ball fifty. It wasn't entirely all batsmen-led action however, as Brett Lee claimed the first hat-trick in Twenty20 internationals, for Australia against Bangladesh. The breathless tournament culminated in a final that thrilled from start to finish, as India and Pakistan battled it out for the trophy. The match went down to a final-over thriller, with Pakistan needing six from the last four balls. But India eventually triumphed as Misbah-ul-Haq's attempted scoop off Joginder Sharma landed in the hands of Sreesanth at short fine-leg. Mathew Hayden was the top run getter with 265 runs and Umar Gul took the most wickets, 13. Craig McMillan hit 13 sixes in the tournament, highest by any player.

2009
Format in this tournament was same as the first one: four groups of three, then two groups of four in quarter-finals; top two into semi-finals. This competition was played in London, Lord's and Oval, and Nottingham. Out of the 10 full members, Zimbabwe withdrew its participation. Ireland, Netherlands and Scotland qualified for the tournament. It was full of surprise victories, as favourites fell at the hands of underdogs. The hosts, England, set the ball rolling in the first match of the tournament as they were embarrassed by Netherlands in a final-ball thriller. Australia were dominated by West Indies, largely thanks to a thunderous innings by Chris Gayle, as he hit 88 off 50 balls, including some of the largest sixes seen in England. Australia were then defeated by Sri Lanka, who bowled tightly and batted with dominance, including quick-fire half centuries from Tillakaratne Dilshan and Kumar Sangakkara. Ireland beat Bangladesh in the Group stage to qualify for the Super Eight. Previous champions, India, lost all its matches of the Super Eight Stage. South Africa hadn't lost a group stage match going into the semi-finals against Pakistan, but Shahid Afridi produced a match winning performance with both bat and ball. He blasted his way to 51 and bagged two wickets for 16 runs to secure victory. The final at Lord's was a repeat of a group stage match between Sri Lanka and Pakistan; the latter lost the previous encounter. Pakistan managed to remove Dilshan, the Player of the Series for his 317 runs, without scoring, which had a big impact on the Sri Lanka innings. Sangakkara put up a fight scoring an unbeaten 64, but a target of 138 wasn't going to be easy to defend. Afridi proved this to be correct, hitting an unbeaten 54, which helped Man of the Match Pakistan win the trophy with 8 balls to spare.
Umar Gul was the top wicket taker with 13 wickets, a repeat performance of 2007 edition. Yuvraj Singh hit the most sixes in the tournament.

2010
The West Indies hosted the third World Twenty20 a little over eight months after the previous tournament. The format in this tournament too same as in the previous two. The 12 teams consisted of the ten full members and two associates. England proved the surprise package, winning their first major limited-overs trophy with a comprehensive victory over Australia in the final. The Australians had provided amazing fireworks in the semi-final when Pakistan appeared on course for a second final only for Michael Hussey to smash 26 from five deliveries (in a 24-ball 60 not out) to win the game with a ball to spare. The significant strugglers were India and South Africa; one disturbed by the short ball, the other unable to pace a run chase. In this edition too, India lost all the three matches of the Super-8 stage. To the frustration of the commercial gurus in the game, India's elimination before the semi-finals again meant lost revenue. The two Associates – Ireland and Afghanistan – far from disgraced themselves. Mahela Jayawardene scored 302 runs, maximum in this edition of World T20. Dirk Nannes, the Dutch bowler who later qualified for Australian selection was the highest wicket taker with 14 wickets. Cameron White with 12 sixes topped the number of sixes chart.

Expansion to 16 teams

2012
The 2012 edition was to be expanded into a 16 team format however this was reverted to 12. It was the first time the tournament took place in an Asian country, hosted by Sri Lanka in three cities; Colombo, Pallekele and Hambantota. It was played by the same 12 teams that played in the 2010 tournament, Ireland and Afghanistan and the ten full members. For the first time, a host nation managed to get on to the knock-out stage of the ICC World Twenty20. However the tournament was won by the West Indies, by defeating Sri Lanka by 36 runs. It was by the virtue of the power packed 78 scored by Marlon Samuels the followed some tight bowling by the slow bowlers. Ironically West Indies qualified for the Super-8 stage without winning even a single match in the initial round. Pakistan and Australia were the losing semi-finalists, with Pakistan making into last four on all the occasions and Australia missing only in 2009. India won both the matches of the first round becoming the only team not to lose even a single first round match in the first four editions of the ICC World Twenty20. Shane Watson topped the run charts with 249 runs. Chris Gayle struck 16 sixes, maximum by any player. Ajantha Mendis topped wickets chart with 16 wickets, including an all-time best performance of 6 for 8 against Zimbabwe

2014
The 2014 tournament, held in Bangladesh was the first to feature 16 teams including all ten full members and six associate members who qualified through the 2013 ICC World Twenty20 Qualifier. However the top eight full member teams in the ICC T20I Championship rankings on 8 October 2012 were given a place in the Super 10 stage. The remaining eight teams competed in the group stage, from which two teams advance to the Super 10 stage. Three new teams (Nepal, Hong Kong and United Arab Emirates) made their debut in this tournament. The tournament was won by Sri Lanka, who convincingly beat India by 6 wickets with 13 balls to spare. Imran Tahir of South Africa and Virat Kohli of India were the highest wicket taker and run scorer respectively.

Winning teams, captains, and coaches

See also
 ICC Men's T20 World Cup

References

External links
 Official 2014 ICC World Twenty20 site

 History